Merioneth, sometimes called Merionethshire, was a constituency in North Wales established in 1542, which returned one Member of Parliament (MP)  to the House of Commons of the English Parliament, and later to the Parliament of Great Britain and of the United Kingdom. It was abolished for the 1983 general election, when it was largely replaced by the new constituency of Meirionnydd Nant Conwy.

Overview

Boundaries
The constituency consisted of the historic county of Merionethshire. Merioneth was always an almost entirely rural constituency, rocky and mountainous with grazing the only useful agricultural activity that could be pursued; quarrying was its other main economic mainstay. It was also a strongly Welsh-speaking area (a parliamentary paper in 1904 listed that just 6.2% of the population could only speak English, lower than in any other county in Wales), and by the 19th century was a stronghold of non-conformist religion.

Establishment
Like the rest of Wales, Merioneth was given the right to representation by the Laws in Wales Acts 1535-1542, and first returned an MP to the Parliament of 1542; however, unlike all the other Welsh counties, Merioneth had no towns sufficiently important in the 16th century to merit borough status, so the county MP was its only representative. The MP was chosen by the first past the post electoral system – when there was a contest at all, which was almost unheard of before the second half of the 19th century.

Franchise and political influences before the Reform Act
As in other county constituencies, the franchise until 1832 was defined by the Forty Shilling Freeholder Act, which gave the right to vote to every man who possessed freehold property within the county valued at £2 or more per year for the purposes of land tax; it was not necessary for the freeholder to occupy his land, nor even in later years to be resident in the county at all. Nevertheless, the electorate was small, probably only a few hundred, though the lack of contested elections make it impossible to be sure: at the 1774 election, the only one to go to a poll in the 18th century, exactly 600 votes were cast. By way of comparison, the population at the time of the 1831 census was about 34,500.

For more than a century before the Reform Act, Merioneth's representation was almost entirely monopolised by the Vaughan family of Corsygedol – they and the Wynns of Wynnstay, who supported them, were the two leading families of the county and the expense of a contested election was presumably seen as futile by any potential opposition candidates. When a magnate from outside the county, The Earl of Powis, did intervene in 1774, his candidate was roundly defeated. Since the Vaughans were not aligned with any of the great aristocratic interests of the rest of Wales, and were generally regarded as maintaining their independence, there was little partisan interest in dislodging them.

Survival as a constituency with low population
Although the franchise was somewhat extended under the Great Reform Act, Merioneth's registered electorate at the first post-Reform election was only 580. However, it seems that this considerably under-represented those who were eligible, and more voters could be induced to register by vigorous campaigning. The Liberation Society, a body aiming to maximise the non-conformist vote to achieve disestablishment of the church, was active in Merioneth and a number of other Welsh counties in the 1850s and 1860s, and between the elections of 1859 and 1865 Merioneth's electorate rose by 50%, from 1,091 to 1,527. But there was also a dramatic rise in the electorate between 1835 and 1837 (from 698 to 1,336), which is less easy to explain. Nevertheless, even with these occasional peaks, Merioneth was a small constituency by Welsh – let alone English – standards.

By the time of the 1911 census, the population of Merioneth was 46,849, and in other circumstances it would have been too small to survive as a separate constituency, but the physical geography meant that the inconvenience which would be caused to voters and MPs alike by combining it with a neighbouring county outweighed any arguments for mathematical equality of representation. In 1929, the first election at which all adult men and women had the vote, Merioneth's electorate was under 29,000, and it had fallen even further (to 27,619) by the time of the final (1979) election before the constituency was abolished, even with the extension of the franchise to 18- to 21-year-olds in the 1960s.

Political character after the 1860s
The gentry returned unopposed as MPs in Merioneth's deferential days had usually been Conservatives. At the 1850 general election, the sitting member, W.W.E. Wynne of Peniarth, was challenged by the Liberal, David Williams. In an election characterised by allegations of coercion against the nonconformist tenantry, Wynne held the seat by a small majority. In 1865, Wynne stood down, and was succeeded as Conservative candidate by his son, W.R.M. Wynne. Against some expectations, he held the seat with a slightly reduced majority, and this was attributed by Ieuan Gwynedd Jones to 'a sense of terror' that had struck the mainly nonconformist tenant farmers.   In 1868, following the extension of the franchise, Wynne withdrew rather than face another contest which he was likely to lose. With the introduction of the secret ballot, Merioneth became one of the safest Liberal seats in Wales – mainly the effect of the high number of workers in the slate and limestone quarries round Ffestiniog and Corwen. With the foundation of the Labour Party, the seat became less safe, but the Liberals held it through the first half of the 20th century, losing it to Labour, when Emrys Roberts was defeated by T.W. Jones. The Liberals remained the main challengers until the 1960s. However, with the emergence of Plaid Cymru as a political force, Merioneth was natural territory for the nationalists: they overtook the Liberals for second place behind Labour in 1970, and then Dafydd Elis-Thomas captured the seat at the February 1974 election, one of the first two seats the party had won at a general election. They retained it comfortably in October 1974 and 1979.

Abolition
The constituency was finally abolished with effect from the 1983 general election, when the alignment of constituency boundaries with the revised Welsh county boundaries necessitated a change. The Boundary Commission's original proposals would have united Merioneth with English-speaking Conwy on the North Wales coast, and would almost certainly have extinguished Plaid Cymru's chances of holding the seat, but after a public enquiry much more modest changes were adopted. The bulk of the electorate formed the core of the new Meirionnydd Nant Conwy constituency, joined by only around 5,000 voters from outside the old county, while about 3,000 voters in that part of Merionethshire which had been placed in Clwyd rather than Gwynedd moved to the new Clwyd South West constituency.

Members of Parliament

MPs 1542–1640

MPs 1640–1983

Election results

Elections in the 1830s

Vaughan resigned, causing a by-election.

Elections in the 1840s

Elections in the 1850s

Elections in the 1860s

Elections in the 1870s
Williams' death caused a by-election.

Elections in the 1880s

Elections in the 1890s 

Ellis was appointed a Lord Commissioner of the Treasury, requiring a by-election.

Ellis' death caused a by-election.

Elections in the 1900s

Elections in the 1910s 

General Election 1914–15:

Another General Election was required to take place before the end of 1915. The political parties had been making preparations for an election to take place and by the July 1914, the following candidates had been selected; 
Liberal: Henry Haydn Jones
Unionist: Sam Thompson

Elections in the 1920s

Elections in the 1930s 

A General election was due to take place before the end of 1940, but was postponed due to the Second World War. By the Autumn of 1939, the following candidates had been selected to contest this constituency;
Liberal Party: Henry Haydn Jones
Labour Party: Thomas Jones

Elections in the 1940s

Elections in the 1950s

Elections in the 1960s

Elections in the 1970s

References

Sources
 The BBC/ITN Guide to the New Parliamentary Constituencies (Chichester: Parliamentary Research Services, 1983)
Cobbett's Parliamentary history of England, from the Norman Conquest in 1066 to the year 1803 (London: Thomas Hansard, 1808) 
 Matthew Cragoe, Culture, Politics, and National Identity in Wales 1832–1886 (Oxford: Oxford University Press, 2004)
F W S Craig, British Parliamentary Election Results 1832–1885 (2nd edition, Aldershot: Parliamentary Research Services, 1989)
 F W S Craig, British Parliamentary Election Results 1918–1949 (Glasgow: Political Reference Publications, 1969)

 Lewis Namier & John Brooke, The History of Parliament: The House of Commons 1754-1790 (London: HMSO, 1964)
 J E Neale, The Elizabethan House of Commons (London: Jonathan Cape, 1949)
 Henry Pelling, Social Geography of British Elections 1885–1910 (London: Macmillan, 1967)
 J Holladay Philbin, Parliamentary Representation 1832 – England and Wales (New Haven: Yale University Press, 1965)
 Robert Waller, The Almanac of British Politics (1st edition, London: Croom Helm, 1983)

History of Merionethshire
Historic parliamentary constituencies in North Wales
Constituencies of the Parliament of the United Kingdom established in 1542
Constituencies of the Parliament of the United Kingdom disestablished in 1974